Jamat Raza-e-Mustafa also known as JRM, is a historical organisation of Indian Sunni Barelvi Muslims associated with Sufism. It was founded by the Great Scholar and 14th Century Mujadid, AlaHazrat Imam Ahmed Raza Khan Khan al-Qadiri al-Hanafi on 17 December 1920 at Bareilly (India) to propagate true Islamic teachings in accordance with Ahle Sunnah wal Jama'ah. The grand Iman established it to make Muslims religiously, socially and financially strong as well as powerful. One of the aim of JRM includes to deny misguided sects and safeguard the beliefs (Aqaa'id) of the Ahle Sunnah wal Jama'ah.

History
It played a significant role during Shuddhi movement which was initiated by Arya Samaj to convert Muslims into Hinduism. The Jamat Raza-e-Mustafa prevented around four hundred thousand re-conversions to Hinduism in eastern U.P and Rajasthan during its activities under anti-Shuddhi movement.

In 1917, Allama Naeem-ud-Deen Muradabadi organized the historical Jamat Raza-e-Mustafa conference at Jamia Naeemia Moradabad, a group whose mission was to curb, and if possible reverse, the tide of re-conversions threatening the Muslim community in the wake of the Shuddhi movement.

Mufti Mustafa Raza Khan was the another influential leader of Jamat Raza-e-Mustafa who worked against the Shuddhi movement, which aims to convert Muslims to Hinduism in pre-Partition India.
The organisation also worked for the defence of Sufi Sunni beliefs in south Asia as practiced by large numbers of people known as Barelvis. It would also act as a quasi-political organisation in opposition to the Deobandi-dominated JUH.

Present
Stand on CAA and NRC
In December 2019, following the deaths of people following a protest against the Citizenship (Amendment) Act, 2019 (CAA), Jamat wrote a letter to president Ram Nath Kovind and Yogi Adityanath, Chief Minister of Uttar Pradesh, to demand compensation for families of the victims and the injured.  In January 2020 Jamat announced to hold peaceful protests till the government gives in and announces a rollback of CAA and Proposed NRC. President of Jamat Raza-e-Mustafa and Sunni Barelvi cleric Mufti Asjad Raza Khan is of the view that CAA/NRC issue is about protecting the constitutional principles and values and it is not a Hindu-Muslim issue. He also praised protesters of anti-CAA protests., 
Salman Raza Khan, vice president of Jamat Raza-e-Mustafa called for boycott of National Population Register if it is not on the lines of the 2011 census.
Stand on Uniform Civil Code
The Jamat has opposed any proposed implementation of Uniform Civil Code (UCC). It is of the view that UCC will affect personal laws of not only of Muslims, but of Jain, Sikhs, Parsis and Christians communities too.
Stand on Haj Tax by Saudi authorities
Jamat Raza-e-Mustafa opposed the Saudi Arabian government decision to impose 2,000 Riyal or Rs 36,000 as tax on second Haj in 2016.

References

External links

Taarikh (History) of Jamat Raza-e-Mustafa

Sunni organizations
Barelvi organizations
Islamic organisations based in India
Barelvi
Memorials to Ahmed Raza Khan Barelvi